The Iraqi civil war was a civil war fought mainly between the Iraqi government along with American-led coalition forces and various sectarian armed groups, mainly Al Qaeda in Iraq and the Mahdi Army, from 2006 to 2008. In February 2006, sectarian tensions in Iraq escalated into a full-scale civil war after the bombing of the Al-Askari Shrine (which is considered one of the holiest sites in Shia Islam) by the Sunni organization Al-Qaeda in Iraq. This set off a wave of reprisals by Shia militants on Sunni civilians, followed by Sunni counterattacks on Shia civilians.
In 2006, the Secretary General of the United Nations declared that if patterns of discord and violence continued to prevail, the Iraqi state was in danger of breaking up. In a 10 January 2007 address to the American people, President George W. Bush stated that "80% of Iraq's sectarian violence occurs within  of the capital. This violence is splitting Baghdad into sectarian enclaves, and shakes the confidence of all Iraqis.". The conflict escalated over the next several months until by late 2007, the National Intelligence Estimate described the conflict as having elements of a civil war. In 2008, during the Sunni Awakening and the U.S. troop surge, violence declined dramatically. However, an insurgency by Al-Qaeda in Iraq continued to plague Iraq following the U.S. withdrawal from the country in late 2011. In June 2014 the Islamic State of Iraq and the Levant, the successor of Al-Qaeda in Iraq, launched a major military offensive in Iraq and declared a self-proclaimed worldwide Islamic caliphate, leading to a full-scale war mainly between Iraq and ISIL from 2013 to 2017 in which Iraq declared full victory against the terrorist group.

In October 2006, the Office of the United Nations High Commissioner for Refugees (UNHCR) and the Iraqi government estimated that more than 370,000 Iraqis had been displaced since the 2006 bombing of the al-Askari Mosque, bringing the total number of Iraqi refugees to more than 1.6 million. By 2008, the UNHCR raised the estimate of refugees to a total of about 4.7 million (~16% of the population). The number of refugees estimated abroad was 2 million (a number close to CIA projections) and the number of internally displaced people was 2.7 million. The Red Cross stated in 2008 that Iraq's humanitarian situation was among the most critical in the world, with millions of Iraqis forced to rely on insufficient and poor-quality water sources.

According to the Failed States Index, produced by Foreign Policy magazine and the Fund for Peace, Iraq was one of the world's top 5 unstable states from 2005 to 2008. A poll of top U.S. foreign policy experts conducted in 2007 showed that over the next 10 years, just 3% of experts believed the U.S. would be able to rebuild Iraq into a "beacon of democracy" and 58% of experts believed that Sunni–Shi'a tensions would dramatically increase in the Middle East. Two polls of Americans conducted in 2006 found that between 65% to 85% believed Iraq was in a civil war; however, a similar poll of Iraqis conducted in 2007 found that 61% did not believe that they were in a civil war.

Participants 

A multitude of groups formed the Iraqi insurgency, which arose in a piecemeal fashion as a reaction to local events, notably the realisation of the U.S. military's inability to control Iraq. Beginning in 2005 the insurgent forces coalesced around several main factions, including the Islamic Army in Iraq and Ansar al-Sunna. Religious justification was used to support the political actions of these groups, as well as a marked adherence to Salafism, branding those against the jihad as non-believers. This approach played a role in the rise of sectarian violence. The U.S. military also believed that between 5-10% of insurgent forces were non-Iraqi Arabs.

AQI and groups associated with it steadily became a brutal and wasteful foreign occupation force, engaging Yemeni, Saudi, Moroccan, Palestinian, Syrian and Lebanese foreign fighters. Independent Shi'a militias identified themselves around sectarian ideology and possessed various levels of influence and power. Some militias were founded in exile and returned to Iraq only after the toppling of Saddam Hussein, such as the Badr Organization. Others were created since the state collapse, the largest and most uniform of which was the Mahdi Army established by Muqtada al-Sadr and believed to have around 50,000 fighters.

Conflict and tactics

Non-military targets 
Attacks on non-military and civilian targets began in earnest in August 2003 as an attempt to sow chaos and sectarian discord. Iraqi casualties increased over the next several years.

By the end of 2008, where the civil war had ended, there was evidence of a decrease in civilian casualties, and likewise in ethno-sectarian casualties. The commanding general of the Multi-National Force-Iraq (MNF-I), Raymond Odierno, testified before the House Armed Services Committee in September 2009 that overall attacks had decreased 85% in the last two years from 4064 in August 2007 to 594 in August. 2009: with 563 attacks in September (through September 28).

(Patterns In Civilian Casualties in Iraq: 2004-2009)

Bomb and mortar attacks 
Bomb attacks aimed at civilians usually targeted crowded places such as marketplaces and mosques in Shi'a cities and districts. The bombings, which were sometimes co-ordinated, often inflicted extreme casualties.

For example, the 23 November 2006 Sadr City bombings killed at least 215 people and injured hundreds more in the Sadr City district of Baghdad, sparking reprisal attacks, and the 3 February 2007 Baghdad market bombing killed at least 135 and injured more than 300. The co-ordinated 2 March 2004 Iraq Ashura bombings (including car bombs, suicide bombers and mortar, grenade and rocket attacks) killed at least 178 people and injured at least 500.

Suicide bombings 

Since August 2003, suicide car bombs were increasingly used as weapons by Sunni militants, primarily al-Qaeda extremists. The car bombs, known in the military as vehicle-borne improvised explosive devices (VBIEDs), emerged as one of the militants' most effective weapons, directed not only against civilian targets but also against Iraqi police stations and recruiting centers.

These vehicle IEDs were often driven by the extremists from foreign Muslim countries with a history of militancy, such as Saudi Arabia, Algeria, Egypt, and Pakistan. Multiple suicide bombings had roughly the same target distribution as single blasts: about three-quarters of single and multiple blasts were sent against Iraqi targets.

Death squads 
Death squad-style killings in Iraq took place in a variety of ways. Kidnapping, followed by often extreme torture (such as drilling holes in people's feet with drills) and execution-style killings, sometimes public (in some cases, beheadings), emerged as another tactic. In some cases, tapes of the execution were distributed for propaganda purposes. The bodies were usually dumped on a roadside or in other places, several at a time. There were also several relatively large-scale massacres, like the Hay al Jihad massacre in which some 40 Sunnis were killed in a response to the car bombing which killed a dozen Shi'a.

The death squads were often disgruntled Shi'a, including members of the security forces, who killed Sunnis to avenge the consequences of the insurgency against the Shi'a-dominated government.

Allegations of the existence of the death squads, made up of Shiites, and their role in executions of Sunnis, began to be promulgated when Bayan Jabr took over the Interior Ministry, although there was no exact proof. On top of that the Badr Brigade, a military wing of the pro-Iranian Supreme Council of the Islamic Revolution in Iraq, was accused of being behind the killings.

Iraq Body Count project data shows that 33% of civilian deaths during the Iraq War resulted from execution after abduction or capture. These were overwhelmingly carried out by unknown actors including insurgents, sectarian militias and criminals. Such killings occurred much more frequently during the 2006–07 period of sectarian violence.

Attacks on places of worship 
On 22 February 2006, a highly provocative explosion took place at the al-Askari Mosque in the Iraqi city of Samarra, one of the holiest sites in Shi'a Islam, believed to have been caused by a bomb planted by al-Qaeda in Iraq. With the explicit strategic goal of triggering a "sectarian war", Al-Zarqawi hoped that through such a sectarian conflict he could rally Iraq's Sunnis behind a common cause against the Shiite-dominated government in Baghdad and the U.S. occupation.

Although no injuries occurred in the blast, the mosque was severely damaged and the bombing resulted in violence over the following days. Over 100 dead bodies with bullet holes were found the next day, and at least 165 people are thought to have been killed. In the aftermath of this attack the U.S. military calculated that the average homicide rate in Baghdad tripled from 11 to 33 deaths per day.

Dozens of Iraqi mosques were afterwards attacked or taken over by the sectarian forces. For example, a Sunni mosque was burnt in the southern Iraqi town of Haswa on 25 March 2007, in revenge for the destruction of a Shi'a mosque in the town the previous day. In several cases, Christian churches were also attacked by the extremists. Later, another al-Askari bombing took place in June 2007.

Iraq's Christian minority also became a target by Al Qaeda Sunnis because of conflicting theological ideas.

Sectarian desertions 
Some Iraqi service members deserted the military or the police and others refused to serve in hostile areas. For example, some members of one sect refused to serve in neighborhoods dominated by other sects. The ethnic Kurdish soldiers from northern Iraq, who were mostly Sunnis but not Arabs, were also reported to be deserting the army to avoid the civil strife in Baghdad.

The deserting soldiers left behind weapons, uniforms and warehouses full of heavy weaponry. Before the fall of Mosul, the ISF was losing 300 soldiers a day to desertions and deaths.

Timeline 

For more information on events in a specific year, see the associated timeline page.

Growth in refugee flight 

 By 2008, the UNHCR raised the estimate of refugees to a total of about 4.7 million, with 2 million displaced internally and 2.7 million displaced externally. In April 2006 the Ministry of Displacement and Migration estimated that "nearly 70,000 displaced Iraqis, especially from the capital, are living in deteriorating conditions," due to ongoing sectarian violence. Roughly 40% of Iraq's middle class is believed to have fled, the U.N. said. Most were fleeing systematic persecution and had no desire to return. Refugees were mired in poverty as they were generally barred from working in their host countries. A 25 May 2007 article noted that in the past seven months only 69 people from Iraq had been granted refugee status in the United States.

Iraqi Civil War from the theories of civil warfare
Each theory summarizes and illuminates a certain set of causes that triggered the sectarian civil war in Iraq since 2006.

 Weak State

Iraq was already a weak state before the invasion in 2003, with multiple economic that affected the capacity of the Iraqi state. The Hussein regime lacked legitimacy as the people did not perceive it as a legitimate ruler at the time of the U.S. invasion. The key factor evidencing the lack of Iraqi state capacity is the inability to provide security for its inhabitants.

 Failed state

The failure of the state was a morisco to trigger the civil war, after the invasion by the US government lawlessness was present which triggered a security vacuum. The sectarian security dilemma was triggered by the security vacuum of the collapse of the state and the subsequent period of violence after the al-Askari mosque bombing.

 Poor Leaders

Economic and political problems undermined the Iraqi state, stemming from previous wars in which Iraq was involved. The sectarian basis of Hussein's regime delimited the conflict that was taking place between Sunnis, Shiites and Kurds, which meant that poor leadership had incurred in triggering the civil war.

 Economy

The economy is a key factor in understanding the development of the sectarian conflict that occurred. The Sunnis, compared to other ethnic groups, had more purchasing power due to higher job preferences and wages during Hussein's rule. With the U.S. invasion and the fall of Hussein, thousands of Sunnis were left without jobs, leading them to join the insurgency. Control of oil was also a factor, thanks to non-existent legislation on the dispersal of oil revenues.

Use of "civil war" label 
The use of the term "civil war" has been controversial, with a number of commentators preferring the term "civil conflict". A weak state, defined as lacking legitimacy, capacity and effective and functional institutions, is the main permissive cause of civil war.

A poll of over 5,000 Iraqi nationals found that 27% of polled Iraqi residents agreed that Iraq was in a civil war, while 61% thought Iraq was not. Two similar polls of Americans conducted in 2006 found that between 65% to 85% believed Iraq was in a civil war.

In the United States, the term has been politicized. Deputy leader of the United States Senate, Dick Durbin, referred to "this civil war in Iraq" in a criticism of the President's Address to the Nation by George W. Bush's on 10 January 2007.

Edward Wong on 26 November 2006 paraphrased a report from a group of American professors at Stanford University that the insurgency in Iraq amounted to the classic definition of a civil war.

An unclassified summary of the 90-page January 2007 National Intelligence Estimate, titled Prospects for Iraq's Stability: A Challenging Road Ahead, states the following regarding the use of the term "civil war":
 The Intelligence Community judges that the term "civil war" does not adequately capture the complexity of the conflict in Iraq, which includes extensive Shi'a-on-Shi'a violence, al-Qa'ida and Sunni insurgent attacks on Coalition forces, and widespread criminally motivated violence. Nonetheless, the term "civil war" accurately describes key elements of the Iraqi conflict, including the hardening of ethno-sectarian identities, a sea change in the character of the violence, ethno-sectarian mobilization, and population displacements.

Retired United States Army General Barry McCaffrey issued a report on 26 March 2007, after a trip and analysis of the situation in Iraq. The report labeled the situation a "low-grade civil war". In page 3 of the report, he writes that:

See also 

 Iraq conflict (2003–present)
 Casualties of the conflict in Iraq since 2003
 Shi'a–Sunni relations
 Iraqi insurgency
 Refugees of Iraq

Events:
 2 March 2004 Iraq Ashura bombings
 23 November 2006 Sadr City bombings
 22 January 2007 Baghdad bombings
 3 February 2007 Baghdad market bombing
 Hay al Jihad massacre

General:
 Ethnic cleansing
 Ethnic conflict
 Sectarianism
 Religion in Iraq
 Religious war

Films
 Iraq in Fragments, documentary (2006)

References

Bibliography 
 Iraq Study Group, The Iraq Study Group Report: The Way Forward – A New Approach (2006)
 Nir Rosen, In the Belly of the Green Bird: The Triumph of the Martyrs in Iraq (2006)

External links 
 Refugees Report "The Iraqi Displacement Crisis" Refugees International, March 2008.
 United States Dept. of Homeland Security Fact Sheet on admitting Iraqi refugees to the United States March 2008.
 Sami Ramadani interview "Iraq is not a civil war" International Socialism, Spring 2007.
 Taheri, Amir. "There is no Civil War in Iraq, Gulf News, 6 December 2006.
 Phillips, David L., "Federalism can prevent Iraq civil war", 20 July 2005.
 Hider, James, "Weekend of slaughter propels Iraq towards all-out civil war", The Times, 18 July 2005.
 Ramadani, Sami, "Occupation and Civil War", The Guardian, 8 July 2005.
 Phelps, Timothy M., "Experts: Iraq Verges on Civil War". Newsday, 12 May 2005.
 Strobel, Warren P., and Jonathan S. Landay, "CIA Officers Warn of Iraq Civil War, Contradicting Bush's Optimism", Knight-Ridder, 22 January 2004.
 "US exit may lead to Iraqi civil war", Sydney Morning Herald, 19 November 2003.
 Dunnigan, James, "The Coming Iraqi Civil War", 4 April 2003

2004 in Iraq
2005 in Iraq
2006 in Iraq
2007 in Iraq
2008 in Iraq
Iraq War
Al-Qaeda activities in Iraq

Occupation of Iraq
Politics of Iraq
Religiously motivated violence in Iraq
Civil wars in Iraq
Civil wars post-1945
Religion-based civil wars
Wars involving Iraq